Fraser Henry Hamilton Waters (born 31 March 1976 in Cape Town) is an English former rugby union footballer who played at Centre for clubs including London Wasps and Treviso.

Biography
Waters grew up in Cape Town before moving, aged 11, with his family to Jersey in the Channel Islands. He was educated at Harrow School and the University of Bristol.

He started his professional career at Bath where in May 1996, he played in the cross-code games against Wigan, who were then England's top union and league sides respectively.

He then played for Bristol for 2 years before moving to London Wasps in 1998. He was widely credited with orchestrating the renowned "blitz defence" which helped the club to numerous trophies, including 4 Premiership and 2 Heineken Cup titles. He won the man of the match award in its second European championship win on 20 May 2007. The final, played at Twickenham, set a world record for the highest attendance figure for a club rugby match (at around 82,000). Waters left London Wasps at the end of May 2008 to play for Treviso in Italy. He retired in 2012.

Honours 
Wasps
Premiership 2002–03, 2003–04, 2004–05, 2007–08
Powergen Cup 1998–99, 1999–00, 2005–06
Heineken Cup 2003–04, 2006–07
Parker Pen Challenge Cup 2002–03

England
3 Caps 2001–04

References

1976 births
Living people
England international rugby union players
English rugby union players
South African rugby union players
Rugby union players from Cape Town
People educated at Harrow School
Alumni of Diocesan College, Cape Town
Wasps RFC players
Rugby union centres